Kara Agach may refer to:
Kara Agach, Maku
Kara Agach, Showt